Sergey S. Radchenko is a Soviet-born British historian. He is the Wilson E. Schmidt Distinguished Professor at the Henry A. Kissinger Center for Global Affairs, Johns Hopkins School of Advanced International Studies, and visiting professor at Cardiff University.

He is a historian of the Cold War, mainly known for his work on Sino-Soviet relations and Soviet foreign policy.

Selected publications 
Radchenko, Sergey. Two suns in the heavens: the Sino-Soviet struggle for supremacy, 1962-1967. Vol. 33. Woodrow Wilson Center Press, 2009.
Craig, Campbell, and Sergey S. Radchenko. The atomic bomb and the origins of the Cold War. Yale University Press, 2008.
Radchenko, Sergey. Unwanted Visionaries: The Soviet Failure in Asia at the End of the Cold War. Oxford University Press, 2014.
Kalinovsky, Artemy, and Sergey Radchenko, eds. The end of the Cold War and the Third World: new perspectives on regional conflict. Taylor & Francis, 2011.

References 

Year of birth missing (living people)
Living people
Johns Hopkins University faculty
21st-century American  historians
British international relations scholars
Historians of warfare

Cold War historians